Edward Hawkins  (born 1977) is a Professor of climate science at the University of Reading, principal research scientist at the National Centre for Atmospheric Science (NCAS), editor of climate lab book blog and lead scientist for the weather rescue citizen science project. He is known for his data visualizations of climate change for the general public such as warming stripes and climate spirals.

Education
Hawkins was educated at the University of Nottingham where he was awarded a PhD in astrophysics in 2003 for research supervised by Steve Maddox that investigated galaxy clustering in large redshift surveys.

Career and research 
After his PhD, Hawkins served as a Natural Environment Research Council (NERC) advanced research fellow in the department of meteorology at the University of Reading from 2005 to 2013.

 Hawkins is a professor of climate science at the University of Reading, where he serves as academic lead for public engagement and is affiliated with the National Centre for Atmospheric Science (NCAS). He is a lead for Weather Rescue and Rainfall Rescue, citizen science projects in which volunteers transcribe data from historical meteorological and rainfall records for digital analysis.

Hawkins was a contributing author for the IPCC Fifth Assessment Report (2014) and was a lead author for the IPCC Sixth Assessment Report in 2021.

On 9 May 2016, Hawkins published his climate spiral data visualization graphic, which was widely reported as having gone viral. The climate spiral was widely praised, Jason Samenow writing in The Washington Post that the spiral graph was "the most compelling global warming visualization ever made".

On 22 May 2018, Hawkins published his warming stripes data visualization graphic, which has been used by meteorologists in Climate Central's annual #MetsUnite campaign to raise public awareness of global warming during broadcasts on the summer solstice. Hawkins' similar #ShowYourStripes initiative, in which the public could freely download and share graphics customized to specific countries or localities, was launched on 17 June 2019. The warming stripes graphic is used in the logo of the U.S. House Select Committee on the Climate Crisis from 2019 onwards.

Honours and awards
Hawkins' climate spiral design was on the shortlist for the Kantar Information is Beautiful Awards 2016, the design having been featured in the opening ceremony of the August 2016 Summer Olympics in Rio de Janeiro.

Hawkins was awarded the Royal Meteorological Society’s Climate Science Communication Prize in 2017.

In 2018, Hawkins was awarded the Kavli Medal by the Royal Society "for significant contributions to understanding and quantifying natural climate variability and long-term climate change, and for actively communicating climate science and its various implications with broad audiences".

In July 2019, Hawkins was included in the Climate Home News list of ten climate influencers.

Hawkins was appointed Member of the Order of the British Empire (MBE) in the 2020 New Year Honours "For services to Climate Science and to Science Communication".

In June 2021, Hawkins was named in The Sunday Times "Green Power List" which profiled twenty environmentalists in the UK who are "minds engaging with the world’s biggest problem".

Selected publications
According to Google Scholar his most highly cited publications include:
 The Potential to Narrow Uncertainty in Regional Climate Predictions
The 2dF Galaxy Redshift Survey: correlation functions, peculiar velocities and the matter density of the Universe
 Decadal Prediction: Can It Be Skillful?
 Global risk of deadly heat

References

External links
 EdHawkins.org
 

Climate communication
Living people
British climatologists
Intergovernmental Panel on Climate Change contributing authors
Intergovernmental Panel on Climate Change lead authors
Non-fiction environmental writers
People associated with the University of Reading
Year of birth missing (living people)
Members of the Order of the British Empire
Climate change artists